The Pearson symbol, or Pearson notation, is used in crystallography as a means of describing a crystal structure, and was originated by W. B. Pearson. The symbol is made up of two letters followed by a number. For example:
 Diamond structure, cF8
 Rutile structure, tP6

The two (italicised) letters specify the Bravais lattice. The lower-case letter specifies the crystal family, and the upper-case letter the centering type. The number at the end of the Pearson symbol gives the number of the atoms in the conventional unit cell.

The letters A, B and C were formerly used instead of S. When the centred face cuts the X axis, the Bravais lattice is called A-centred. In analogy, when the centred face cuts the Y or Z axis, we have B- or C-centring respectively.

The fourteen possible Bravais lattices are identified by the first two letters:

Pearson symbol and space group

The Pearson symbol does not uniquely identify the space group of a crystal structure. For example, both the NaCl structure (space group Fmm) and diamond (space group Fdm) have the same Pearson symbol cF8.

Confusion also arises in the rhombohedral lattice, which is alternatively described in a centred hexagonal (a = b, c, α = β = 90°, γ = 120°) or primitive rhombohedral (a = b = c, α = β = γ) setting. The more commonly used hexagonal setting has 3 translationally equivalent points per unit cell. The Pearson symbol refers to the hexagonal setting in its letter code (hR), but the following figure gives the number of translationally equivalent points in the primitive rhombohedral setting. Examples: hR1 and hR2 are used to designate the Hg and Bi structures respectively.

Because there are many possible structures that can correspond to one Pearson symbol, a prototypical compound may be useful to specify. Examples of how to write this would be hP12-MgZn or cF8-C. Prototypical compounds for particular structures can be found on the Inorganic Crystal Structure Database (ICSD) or on the AFLOW Library of Crystallographic Prototypes.

Caution

The Pearson symbol should only be used to designate simple structures (elements, some binary compound) where the number of atoms per unit cell equals, ideally, the number of translationally equivalent points.

References

External links

Further reading
United States Naval Research Laboratory - Pearson symbol (Examples and pictures)

Crystallography